In signal processing, the adjoint filter mask  of a filter mask  is reversed in time and the elements are complex conjugated.

Its name is derived from the fact that the convolution with the adjoint filter is the adjoint operator of the original filter, with respect to the Hilbert space  of the sequences in which the inner product is the Euclidean norm.

Properties

References 

Digital signal processing